Bernice Bouie Donald (born September 17, 1951) is an American lawyer and former judge who served as a United States circuit judge of the United States Court of Appeals for the Sixth Circuit from 2011 to 2023. She previously served as a United States district judge of the United States District Court for the Western District of Tennessee from 1995 to 2011.

Biography
Donald was born in DeSoto County, Mississippi. She received a Bachelor of Arts degree from University of Memphis in 1974 and a Juris Doctor from University of Memphis School of Law in 1979. She was in private practice in Memphis, Tennessee from 1979 to 1980, then became a staff attorney of the Employment Law & Economic Development Unit, Memphis Area Legal Services, Tennessee in 1980. Donald was an assistant public defender for the Shelby County Public Defender's Office, Tennessee from 1980 to 1982. From 1985 to 1988, she was an adjunct professor at Cecil C. Humphreys School of Law.

Judicial career

State judicial service 
Donald was a judge on Tennessee's General Sessions Criminal Court from 1982 to 1988, also teaching as an adjunct professor at Southwest Tennessee Community College from 1984 to 1989. Donald became a member of Zeta Phi Beta sorority Alpha Eta Zeta chapter (Memphis, Tennessee) in 1983. From 1988 to 1995, she was a United States bankruptcy judge in the Western District of Tennessee.

Federal judicial service

District court service 
On December 7, 1995, Donald was nominated by President Bill Clinton to a seat on the United States District Court for the Western District of Tennessee vacated by Odell Horton. She was confirmed by the United States Senate on December 22, 1995, and received her commission on December 26, 1995. Her service as a district court judge was terminated on September 8, 2011 when she was elevated to the United States Court of Appeals for the Sixth Circuit.

Court of appeals service 
On December 1, 2010, President Barack Obama nominated Donald for a judgeship on the United States Court of Appeals for the Sixth Circuit to replace Judge Ronald Lee Gilman who assumed senior status on November 21, 2010. The Senate confirmed Donald on September 6, 2011 by a 96–2 vote. She received her commission on September 8, 2011. On September 8, 2022, her successor, Andre Mathis, was confirmed by the Senate. Donald assumed senior status on September 27, 2022, and retired from active service on January 20, 2023.

See also
List of African-American federal judges
List of African-American jurists
List of first women lawyers and judges in the United States
List of first women lawyers and judges in Tennessee

Notes

References
 

|-

1951 births
Living people
20th-century American judges
20th-century American women judges
21st-century American judges
21st-century American women judges
African-American judges
Judges of the United States bankruptcy courts
Judges of the United States Court of Appeals for the Sixth Circuit
Judges of the United States District Court for the Western District of Tennessee
People from DeSoto County, Mississippi
Public defenders
Tennessee state court judges
United States court of appeals judges appointed by Barack Obama
United States district court judges appointed by Bill Clinton
University of Memphis faculty
University of Memphis alumni